Dorothy Donegan (April 6, 1922 – May 19, 1998) was a classically trained  American  jazz pianist and occasional vocalist, primarily known for performing stride and boogie-woogie, as well as bebop, swing, and classical.

Early life, family and education
Donegan was born and raised in Chicago, Illinois, and began studying piano in 1928. She took her first lessons from Alfred N. Simms, a West Indian pianist who also taught Cleo Brown.

She graduated from Chicago's DuSable High School, where she studied with Walter Dyett, a teacher who also worked with Dinah Washington, Johnny Griffin, Gene Ammons, and Von Freeman. She also studied at the Chicago Musical College and the University of Southern California.

Career

She was known for her work in Chicago nightclubs. In 1942 she made her recording debut.

She appeared in Sensations of 1945 with Cab Calloway, Gene Rodgers, and W. C. Fields. She was a protege of Art Tatum, who called her "the only woman who can make me practice". She said that Tatum "was supposed to be blind...I know he could see women.") In 1943, Donegan became the first African American to perform at Chicago's Orchestra Hall. She later said of this pathbreaking performance:
In the first half I played Rachmaninoff and Grieg and in the second I drug it through the swamp – played jazz. Claudia Cassidy reviewed the concert on the first page of the Chicago Tribune. She said I had a terrific technique and I looked like a Toulouse-Lautrec lithograph.

In May 1983, Donegan, along with Billy Taylor, Milt Hinton, Art Blakey, Maxine Sullivan, Jaki Byard, and Eddie Locke, performed at a memorial service for Earl Hines, held at St. Peter's Evangelical Lutheran Church in New York City.

Her first six albums proved to be obscure compared to her successes in performance. It was not until the 1980s that her work gained notice in the jazz world. In particular, a recorded appearance at the 1987 Montreux Jazz Festival and her live albums from 1991 were met with acclaim. Even so, she remained best known for her live performances. She drew crowds with her eclectic mixture of styles and her flamboyant personality. Ben Ratliff argued in The New York Times that "her flamboyance helped her find work in a field that was largely hostile to women. To a certain extent, it was also her downfall; her concerts were often criticized for having an excess of personality."

Donegan was outspoken about her view that sexism, along with her insistence on being paid the same rates as male musicians, had limited her career. In 1992, Donegan received an "American Jazz Master" fellowship from the National Endowment for the Arts, and in 1994, an honorary doctorate from Roosevelt University.

Personal life and demise
Donegan died of cancer in 1998, aged 76, in Los Angeles, California.

Discography

As leader

Filmography
 1944: Sensations of 1945 – musical performer, United Artists 
 1980: North Sea Jazz Classics 1980 – live performance registration by NOS/NPO
 1995: Jazz at Newport '95 – featured performer, concert for PBS
 2008: Dorothy Donegan: Pandemonium

References

Further reading

External links

 Obituary at JazzHouse.org

1922 births
1998 deaths
African-American jazz pianists
African-American pianists
American women jazz musicians
Women jazz pianists
American jazz pianists
Boogie-woogie pianists
Stride pianists
Jazz musicians from Illinois
Jazz musicians from California
Musicians from Chicago
Deaths from cancer in California
20th-century American women pianists
20th-century American pianists
Storyville Records artists
Black & Blue Records artists
Chiaroscuro Records artists
African-American women musicians
University of Southern California alumni
20th-century African-American women
20th-century African-American musicians